Hayton and Mealo is a civil parish in the Borough of Allerdale in Cumbria, England.  It contains seven listed buildings that are recorded in the National Heritage List for England.  Of these, one is listed at Grade I, the highest of the three grades, and the others are at Grade II, the lowest grade.  The parish contains the village of Hayton and is otherwise rural.  The listed buildings consist of a former tower house and associated structures, three houses, and a former chapel.


Key

Buildings

References

Citations

Sources

Lists of listed buildings in Cumbria